Floyd Thomas Christian, Sr. (December 18, 1914 – May 11, 1998) was Florida Commissioner of Education from 1965 to 1973.

Early life

Christian was born in Bessemer, Alabama. He moved to Pinellas County with his family in 1927.

Education

Christian graduated from St. Petersburg High School in 1933. He received his Bachelor of Arts from the University of Florida in 1937. He received his master's degree in education from the University of Florida in 1950.

Career

He was a teacher and coach at Clearwater High School and coach at Fort Myers High School from 1938 to 1941.

In World War II he served as battalion commander of the 697th Field Artillery and discharged as a colonel in 1946. He received the Legion of Merit, the French Croix de Guerre, a Bronze Star Medal, a Silver Star, and the Italian Medal of Valor.

After the war, Christian was an administrator at the Florida Department of Veterans Affairs in St. Petersburg from 1946 to 1948. Christian was Superintendent of Public Instruction for Pinellas County from 1948 to 1965. Around this time Christian served as president of the Florida Association of County Superintendents (1954), president of the Florida Education Association (1955), and as the first chair of the Florida Educational Television Commission (1955).  Christian was also served on the Florida Board of Regents, and was one of its first appointees when the board was organized in 1965.

Christian was appointed state Superintendent of Public Instruction, by Governor W. Haydon Burns in 1965 and served until 1973. (The Superintendent of Public Instruction post was created by the 1868 Florida Constitution; under the 1885 Constitution, it became an elected position. The Superintendent headed the Department of Public Instruction (1869–1938) and its successor agency, the Florida Department of Education (1939–1968). Under the current Florida Constitution, adopted in 1968 during Christian's term, the title of the post was changed to Commissioner of Education and the post became one of the elected positions in the Florida Cabinet.)

Christian won election as Florida Commissioner of Education in 1970. The Florida statewide teachers' strike of 1968 and the desegregation of Florida schools occurred during Christian's tenure. While he "typified white officialdom's early resistance to desegregation" as Pinellas superintendent, Christian shifted positions and became a "staunch defender of desegregation" as  state Commissioner of Education.

His career ended in 1975 after he was investigated on corruption and several months in federal prison for income tax evasion.

Later life

Christian lived in Sarasota for about 20 years until he moved to a St. Petersburg retirement community in 1997. He suffered from congestive heart disease died at Westminster Shores Health Care Center in 1998 at the age of 83.

References

External links 
A Guide to the Floyd T. Christian Speeches from the George A. Smathers Libraries of the University of Florida

1914 births
1998 deaths
University of Florida alumni
Florida Commissioners of Education
People from Bessemer, Alabama
Recipients of the Silver Star
Recipients of the Legion of Merit
20th-century American politicians